The Bioštica is a small river in central-northern part of Bosnia and Herzegovina. The Bioštica meets the Stupčanica at the small town of Olovo. It is the main, left tributary of the Krivaja River. Part of the Bioštica river canyon, "Zeleni Vir", is protected natural monument of Bosnia and Herzegovina.
From confluence with the Kaljina river, Bioštica runs toward Olovo for the next 12.3 kilometers.

References

Rivers of Bosnia and Herzegovina
Krivaja (Bosna)
Olovo Municipality
Sokolac
Romanija plateau